XERG-AM is a sports radio station on 690 AM in Monterrey, Nuevo León. It is owned by Multimedios Radio and carries a sports format known as RG La Deportiva.

History
XEEO-AM received its concession on April 3, 1959, owned by Multimedios founder Jesús Dionisio González González. In the 1960s, it became XERG-AM and not long after it was transferred to concessionaire Radiodifusoras González, S.A. It originally broadcast with 500 watts during the day and 250 at night. In the 1980s, power was increased to 2,500 watts day and 500 night. A further power hike came in the 2000s.

In December 2017, after a major facility upgrade, RG La Deportiva began to be simulcast on XEDD-AM/XHDD-FM, which in 2018 changed its call letters to XHERG-FM/XEERG-AM.

References

Radio stations in Monterrey
1959 establishments in Mexico
Radio stations established in 1959
Multimedios Radio